Niagara is a Canadian comedy-drama film, directed by Guillaume Lambert and released in 2022. The film centres on three estranged brothers in their 50s — Victor-Hugo (Guy Jodoin), Alain (François Pérusse) and Léo-Louis (Éric Bernier) Lamothe — who must reunite to undertake a road trip to Niagara Falls after their father Léopold (Marcel Sabourin) unexpectedly dies of a heart attack while trying to participate in an ice bucket challenge.

It was the first-ever film role for Pérusse, who is principally known as a stand-up comedian. The film's cast also includes Véronic DiCaire, Katherine Levac, Muriel Dutil, Élisabeth Chouvalidzé, Marie Eykel, Geneviève Néron, Emi Chicoine, Ariel Charest, Louis Sincennes and Josée Deschênes, as well as Lambert in a small supporting role.

The film premiered at the Quebec City Film Festival on September 8, 2022, before going into commercial release on September 16. It was made available for home viewing on the Club Illico platform on November 3. It also screened in the Borsos Competition at the 2022 Whistler Film Festival, where Lambert won the award for Best Screenplay in a Borsos Competition Film.

References

External links

2022 films
2022 comedy-drama films
2022 LGBT-related films
Canadian road comedy-drama films
Canadian LGBT-related films
Films shot in Ontario
Films shot in Quebec
Films set in Ontario
Films set in Quebec
French-language Canadian films
LGBT-related comedy-drama films
2020s Canadian films
Niagara Falls in fiction